The BMW Z4 GTE is a racing car which competed in the sports car races such as the American Le Mans Series, Tudor United SportsCar Championship and European Le Mans Series. It competed from 2013 to 2015 and was replaced in 2016 by the M6 GTLM.

Development 
In late 2012, BMW Motorsport set out to replace the successful M3 GT/GT2, a car which brought BMW two team and manufacturers' championships (2010 & 2011), one drivers' championship (2011), back to back Sebring 12 Hour GT class wins in 2011 and 2012 in the American Le Mans Series, as well as numerous victories in the then Intercontinental Le Mans Cup (now the World Endurance Championship) in Europe. BMW turned to the successful Z4 GT3 platform to develop a LM GTE specification race car for the ALMS, and any GTE class series.

Technical 
The Z4 GTE uses the Z4 body and the same 4.4-litre V8 engine as the GT3 car. The drivetrain and gearbox are much the same in the two different types of Z4. The engine in the GT3 version produces around 500 horsepower, likewise in the GTE version, but the RPM limits are 9000, and 7500, respectively. Most of the differences between the two automobiles are in aerodynamics. The GT3 car has a much more sophisticated aero, with a set of winglets on the front fenders to provide additional downforce. Both cars share a front splitter, while the GTE has slight modifications on the side edges to condition the airflow around the front wheels. The GT3 version also has a double-deck rear wing, with the GTE car having a single deck wing. The rear diffuser is also less aggressive in the GTE car; it also has much wider bodywork in the rear of the car, with heavily modified aero around the wheel arches, front, and specifically rear, compared to the GT3.

American Le Mans Series 
The car was debuted at the 2013 12 Hours of Sebring by BMW Team Rahal Letterman Lanigan Racing running competitively despite being a new car. Leading the GTE class at times, both Z4 GTE's encountered suspension problems with three hours to go and went 3-5 laps down from the class leaders. The cars also showed exceptional handling, but a slight lack of straight-line speed as a result. The 2013 Long Beach Grand Prix proved to be the first win for the car, with the #55 Z4 GTE driven by Bill Auberlen and Maxime Martin driving a fine race, bringing home a 1-2 finish for BMW. A second win for the #56 car of John Edwards and Dirk Muller from pole position at Lime Rock Park proved the pace of the car.

Tudor United SportsCar Championship 
The Z4 GTE will feature in the GTLM class of the Tudor United SportsCar Championship - a merger of the ALMS and Grand-Am, debuting at the 2014 Rolex 24 Hours of Daytona in January.

Turner Motorsport won the inaugural 2014 Tudor United SportsCar GT-Daytona Championship with an altered version of the Z4 GT3. Drivers Dane Cameron and Markus Palttala won four races (Laguna Seca, Watkins Glen 6-Hour, Road America, and Virginia) with Cameron earning the pole position for the 12 Hours of Sebring. To compete in the GTD class, the Turner Z4 lost its GT3-spec aerodynamics, ABS, and traction control systems.

References 

BMW racing cars
LM GTE cars